Charles Harford Lloyd (Thornbury, 16 October 1849 – Eton, 16 October 1919) was an English composer who became a well-known organist in his time.

His most successful area was organ and choral works but he wrote three clarinet pieces for his friend Randle Fynes Holme (1864–1957), (a talented amateur musician), a number of chamber works, a Festival Overture for orchestra, an organ concerto with orchestra and a number of songs for voice and piano.

He served as organist and choir-master at Gloucester Cathedral, Christ Church Cathedral in Oxford, Eton College Chapel and organist at the Chapel Royal. His most frequently performed works today are his settings of the Anglican Church liturgy.

He had a lifelong friendship with Hubert Parry.

Early years
Charles Harford Lloyd was born on 16 October 1849 to a Gloucestershire solicitor, Edmund Lloyd. Charlie, as his intimates called him, began to play the piano at an early age, receiving his first instruction from a governess. When he was ten years old, he played the organ at the neighbouring church of Rangeworthy, where his brother-in-law was the vicar as well as another nearby village of Falfield. He attended the grammar school of his native town for his general education.

In 1862, aged thirteen, he took lessons in piano and harmony with John Barrett, of Bristol, who introduced him to the works of Beethoven and Bach. "He simply revelled in Bach's Forty-eight Preludes and Fugues", said Barrett. He also started composing at an early age, composing a mazurka he called "The Pearl of Denmark", in honour of the Princess of Wales Alexandra of Denmark, and settings of two poems of Tennyson, when he was fourteen.

From 1865 to 1868, he was a pupil at Rossall School in Lancashire. Here he took organ lessons with Charles Handel Tovey, music-master of the school, who introduced him to the more contemporary works of Édouard Batiste and Lefébure-Wély. At Rossall, he played the organ in the school chapel and composed Carmen Rossalliense which became the school song.

Magdalen Hall

A friend of his boyhood was Lady Jenkinson, who had been a pupil of Sigismond Thalberg. Lloyd met Frederick Ouseley and Thomas Gambier Parry at her house. The latter invited him to visit Highnam Court, where Lloyd first met his "attached friend of after years", Hubert Parry. They both stayed up till the small hours making music in the drawing room.

In 1868, Lloyd obtained an open scholarship at Magdalen Hall (later renamed Hertford College), where he matriculated 17 October 1868. While studying there,  Lloyd was founder, with Hubert Parry, and first president of the Oxford University musical club. He took his B.A. degree in 1872, taking a second class in Classical Mods and Theology, however music was quietly taking possession of his life. He was greatly influenced by the organist of Magdalen College, John Stainer, who gave him lessons in harmony but, more importantly, inspired him musically – "I gained an experience of untold value to me in watching him as he played".

Oxford
Lloyd took his B.Mus at Oxford in 1871. His examiners were Ouseley, Charles William Corfe (1814–1883) and Stainer. To make some money, he played the harmonium at Pembroke College Chapel and conducted the Glee Club there. He frequently played duets with Prince Leopold, Duke of Albany and he and Parry played at private gatherings at Cowley House, the residence of Sir Benjamin Brodie. While at Oxford, he was the conductor of a society of undergraduates who called themselves the "Harmonomaniacs". In April 1872, as mentioned above, Lloyd and Parry established the more serious Oxford University Musical Club. The club, known in Oxford as the O.U.M.C., became an important public institution. One of his close friends at Oxford was Sir Walter Parratt.

Tutor
After Oxford, Lloyd had no idea what he wanted to do with his life, so he became a private tutor to the children of socialites. These included the children of the Vernon Harcourts, Lord Inverclyde (then John Burns), of Cunard fame, at Castle Wemyss. At Skelmorlie on the Clyde, he sometimes played the organ in the Presbyterian Church. He saw a great deal of Millais and his wife in Scotland and, through an introduction from them, he visited the Countess Gigliucci (Clara Novello) in Italy. The countess was very impressed with his music-making and was instrumental in Henry Littleton, the proprietor of the music-publishing company Novello & Co, founded by her father Vincent Novello, taking him on as a client. Lloyd said, "But for their helping hand I doubt if any of my compositions would have seen the light. As it is, I have seldom if ever shown them anything which they have refused to publish."

Organist positions

In 1875, The Dean and Chapter of Gloucester Cathedral had approached Lloyd about taking on the classical mastership of the Cathedral Choir School. As it happened, the organist at Gloucester, Samuel Sebastian Wesley, died the following year and the position was immediately offered to Lloyd. This caused dissatisfaction in some musical circles because Lloyd was an unknown at the time, but he soon earned a reputation as an outstanding musician and their fears were put to rest.

The Gloucester organist position carried with it the important office of the Three Choirs Festival, which was held in Gloucester every three years (at that time). Lloyd's first festival was in 1877, for which he selected Brahms' Requiem. A review in The Musical Times stated, "...the intelligence he evinced in the endeavour to realise every point indicated by the composer merit the warmest eulogium."

In 1880, the next time the festival was held, he conducted Beethoven's Mass in D and Hubert Parry's Prometheus Unbound. Prosper Sainton was leader of the orchestra for the festival and wrote Lloyd a letter from France praising both his conducting and Parry's work. Parry was delighted because the critics had not been kind to it. Two of Lloyd's organ pupils, while he was at Gloucester, became well-known organists themselves – they were A. Herbert Brewer, who succeeded him at Gloucester and George Robertson Sinclair who became organist at Hereford Cathedral. Lloyd was organist of Gloucester Cathedral 1876–1881. He was succeeded by Charles Lee Williams.

While at Gloucester Cathedral, Lloyd became the Honorary Secretary of an organisation called Cathedral Organists of England and Wales, which worked for better working and living conditions for organists and choristers.

At the invitation of Dean Henry Liddell, Lloyd became organist at Christ Church Cathedral, Oxford (1882–1891). While in Oxford he took his degree of Doctor of Music in 1890. He was appointed to a specially created lectureship in music at Christ Church and at various times he conducted the Oxford Choral Society, the Oxford Philharmonic Society and the Oxford Orchestral Association; but the most important concerts he directed were a series of Public Classical Concerts organised by the University Musical Club on the initiative of William Henry Hadow which continued for six seasons (1891–1897).

In 1886, Lloyd submitted a cantata, Andromeda to the Three Choirs Festival. It received a favourable but reserved review in The Musical Times.

From 1887 to 1892, Lloyd was an instructor in organ and composition at the Royal College of Music.

Lloyd was invited to fill the position of music teacher at Eton College from 1892, when Sir Joseph Barnby resigned. As Instructor of Music, his work was largely that of supervision with six music teachers under him. He played the organ in the Eton College Chapel every morning and afternoon, as well as on Sundays, and rehearsed the choir. He also gave frequent organ recitals on Sunday evenings. One of his pupils at Eton was Frederick Septimus Kelly, whose musical inclinations were greatly inspired by him.

After retirement from Eton, Lloyd was appointed organist at the Chapel Royal, St James's Palace from 1914, a post he held until his death. He was succeeded by Stanley Roper.

Who's Who of 1906 described Lloyd's recreations as "figure skating, cycling, boating, golf". Lloyd died "very suddenly" on his birthday on 16 October 1919. He was seventy years old that day. The funeral took place at Eton on 21 October 1919. In addition to other works, the Eton College Chapel Choir sang Lloyd's anthem Christ was Delivered for Our Offences.

In 1920, a brass plaque commemorating Lloyd was placed in the Eton College Chapel. It is inscribed in Latin thus, and the following translation appeared in the Musical Times:

"To the dear memory of Charles Harford Lloyd, M.A., Mus.D. Appointed organist of Gloucester Cathedral in 1876 he held that post for six years. Afterwards organist of Christ Church Cathedral, Oxford, for ten years (1882–1892) He held with distinction the post of Precentor at Eton College from 1892 to 1914. Finally appointed Organist (and Composer) to H.M. Chapels Royal; 1917. Born October 16, 1849. Died October 16, 1919."

Works

Incidental music

 1887 – Alcestis, for flute, clarinet, two harps and male chorus (Dramatic Club, Oxford University, Oxford, 18 May 1887)

Orchestral

 1898 – Festival Overture (Gloucester Festival, 11 September 1898)

Solo instrument and orchestra

 1895 – Organ Concerto in F minor (Gloucester Festival, 15 September 1895)

Choral and vocal

 1883 – Allen-a-Dale (Gloucester Festival, 4 September 1883)
 1884 – Hero and Leander (Worcester Festival, 9 September 1884)
 1885 – The Song of Balder (Hereford Festival, 10 September 1885)
 1886 – Andromeda (Gloucester Festival, 7 September 1886)
 1887 – The Longbeard's Saga, for male voices (Christ Church, Oxford, 20 June 1887)
 1888 – The Gleaners' Harvest, cantata for female voices
 1889 – The Rosy Dawn, pastoral (Leeds Festival, 10 October 1889)
 1890 – To Morning, eight-part chorus (Worcester Festival, 10 September 1890)
 1891 – A Song of Judgment, sacred cantata (Hereford Festival, 10 September 1891)
 1894 – Rossall, ode by Owen Seaman for the 50th anniversary of Rossall School, 1844–1894
 1894 – Ballad of Sir Ogie and the Ladie Elsie (Hereford Festival, 11 September 1894)
 1897 – A Hymn of Thanksgiving for the Queen's Long Reign (Hereford Festival, 14 September 1897)
 1901 – The righteous live for evermore (Gloucester Festival, 11 September 1901)

Part-songs

 1884 – Pack, Clouds, Away!
 1885 – When at Corinna's Eyes I Gaze, madrigal for five voices
 1885 – The Patriot
 1885 – Looking for Spring
 1890 – A Sunny Shaft Did I Behold
 1890 – A Wet Sheet and a Flowing Sea
 1890 – Fly to my Mistress, glee
 1895 – An Ode on the Birth of Our Saviour, carol
 1896 – Is not that my Fancy's Queen?
 1896 – Shall I look to ease my Grief?
 1897 – Mark when she smiles
 1897 – Thomalin, why sytten we soe?
 1897 – In Sherwood lived stout Robin Hood
 1898 – Men are fools that wish to die
 1899 – A Thousand Years, by Sea and Land
 1899 – When first I came to Court
 1901 – Three Men of Gotham, for male voices
 1902 – A Loyal Ode, for male voices
 1903 – Up-Hill
 1904 – Dear in Death
 1905 – A Baby's Feet
 1905 – Give a Man a Horse he can ride
 1907 – The Battle of the Baltic, choral ballad
 1907 – Let my voice ring out
 1909 – Kitty of Coleraine
 1909 – The Young May Moon
 1909 – He left the upland Lawns
 1911 – Our Sailor King
 1911 – Hither! hither!
 1913 – A Water Party
 1916 – Grey Stones

Songs

 1876 – Magdalen at St Michael's Gate
 1886 – Annette, for baritone, piano and clarinet (or violin, viola, or cello)
 1890 – Twelve by the Clock for female duet
 1891 – In Summer Weather
 1895 – Come, Tuneful Friends
 1897 – To a Skylark, trio for female voices
 1898 – The Vigil
 1898 – A Song of Exmoor
 1898 – Hawke
 1899 – The Borderers
 1904 – Dear in Death
 1904 – Song of the Dunes
 1908 – He Left the Upland Lawns
 1909 – Cupid is a Wayward Boy
 1910 – Lesbia's Sparrow – Passer mortuus est meae puellae
 1910 – A Little Work, a Little Play
 1910 – April, April
 1911 – To Althea, from Prison
 1913 – O Father all-creating, sacred song
 1916 – Sweet Dreams, form a Shade
 1916 – Queen Mab, for children

Services, etc.

 1880 – Magnificat and Nunc dimittis in F
 1880 – Morning and Evening Service in E flat
 1890 – Magnificat and Nunc dimittis in F
 1883 – Magnificat and Nunc dimittis in G
 1893 – Magnificat and Nunc dimittis in D
 1906 – Communion Service in E, for female voices
 1911 – Magnificat and Nunc dimittis in E, for male voices
 1911 – Te Deum in E, for male voices
 1911 – Benedictus in E, for male voices
 1913 – Communion Service in F
??     – Benedicite in E flat (Chant form)

Anthems

 1876 – Blessed is he that considereth the poor and needy, for soprano or tenor solo, chorus and orchestra (or organ)
 1876 – Give the Lord the Honour
 1876 – Art thou weary?
 1883 – Blessed is He
 1886 – Fear not, O Land, for Harvest
 1889 – Who are We, O Lord?
 1890 – In this was manifested the love of God
 1899 – Lord, teach us to number our Days
 1903 – Sing Ye to the Lord, for Easter
 1904 – Blessed be Thou, O Lord God
 1904 – Praised be the Lord daily
 1905 – Christ Was Delivered for Our Offences, for Easter
 1908 – Let us come boldly
 1917 – Beloved, it is well
 1918 – Grieve not the Holy Spirit of God
 1919 – Awaked from Sleep

Hymn tunes

 1918 – Contributions to Novello's Parish Choir Book:
 Give the Lord the Honour
 A Thirteenth Century Prayer 
 Lie Still Beloved, Lie Still
 Lord, We Uplift Our Voice
 Resignation
 Uprouse Ye, Christian People, for St. George's Day

 c1919 (Published posthumously) – Free Accompaniment of Unison Hymn Singing, ed. A. M. Goodhart

Chamber music

 1888 – Bon voyage for clarinet
 1888 – Duo concertante for violin (or viola, or clarinet) and piano
 1900 – Trio for piano, clarinet, and bassoon
 1912 – Six Easy Pieces for violin and piano
 1912 – Four Characteristic Pieces for violin and piano 
 – In modo d'una sonata
 – Cavatina
 – Mazurka
 – Moto perpetuo
 1912 – Idyll for violin and piano
 1914 – Suite in the Old Style for clarinet (or viola) and piano
 – Prelude
 – Allemande
 – Minuet
 – Sarabande
 – Gigue
 1919 – Three Little Pieces for violin and piano: Romance, A simple melody and Valse mignonne
 1919 – Four Miniatures for violin and piano: Morning song, Lullaby, Dirge and Hornpipe

Piano

 1910 – Two Album Leaves: Good Morning! and Good Night
 1918 – Glyndebourne Dances, suite
 1918 – Two Concert Studies: Toccata and Moto Perpetuo

Organ

 1883 – Allegretto in E
 1886 – Sonata in D minor
 1896 – Allegro agitato
 1896 – Study in canon
 1897 – Elegy
 1917 – Elegy No.2
 Theme, Variations and Finale, edited 1920 by A. Herbert Brewer

Scores and manuscripts

Novello, Ewer & Co., London, published the vocal scores of Alcestis, Andromeda, Hero and Leander, A Hymn of Thanksgiving for the Queen's Long Reign, The Longbeard's Saga, O give thanks unto the Lord, Rossall, The Rosy Dawn, The righteous live for evermore, The Ballad of Sir Ogie and the Ladie Elsie, The Song of Balder and A Song of Judgment.

The autograph score of Andromeda is at the British Library, London (Add MS 50772). Autograph scores of The Ballad of Sir Ogie and the Ladie Elsie, Give the Lord the honour, The Longbeard's Saga, the Magnificat and Nunc dimittis in A, the Magnificat and Nunc dimittis in F and A Song of Judgment are held by the Library of the Royal College of Music, London (Add.Mss 5133).

Publications
 "THE ROYAL COLLEGE OF MUSIC; What Results may be anticipated from the new Royal College of Music; (a) as regards its Influence on the British Public as a Musical Public; (&) as regards the Re-establishment of a National School of Composition?" (1883) Transactions of the National Association for the Promotion of Social Science, Longman's, Green & Co., London

Recordings
 "A Thousand Years, by Sea and Land" (to the "Ode to Queen Victoria" of Henry Newbolt) — on Spiritus Chamber Choir (2009) Choral Songs in Honour of Her Majesty Queen Victoria, Track 3, Toccata Classics TOOC 0012
 "Bon Voyage!" on The Victorian Clarinet Tradition, Colin Bradbury, clarinet, and Oliver Davies, piano, Clarinet Classics CC0022

Notes

References

External links

1849 births
1919 deaths
British composers
British classical organists
British male organists
People from Thornbury, Gloucestershire
Male classical organists